Daniel J. Creedon (July 27, 1914 - October 5, 1982) served in the California State Assembly for the 25th district. During World War II he served in the United States Navy.

References

Republican Party members of the California State Assembly
1914 births
1982 deaths
United States Navy personnel of World War II